Mikko Juusola (born March 17, 1998) is a Finnish professional ice hockey winger who is currently playing for SaiPa in the Liiga.

Juusola began his career with Karpat's junior team for two seasons before moving to KalPa in 2015. He made his Liiga debut for KalPa during the 2017–18 season, playing seven games and scoring one goal.

References

External links

1998 births
Living people
Finnish ice hockey forwards
KalPa players
Iisalmen Peli-Karhut players
People from Kuusamo
SaiPa players
Sportspeople from North Ostrobothnia